The Central Michigan Chippewas team is the basketball team that represent Central Michigan University in Mount Pleasant, Michigan. The school's team currently competes in the Mid-American Conference. The team last played in the NCAA Division I men's basketball tournament in 2003. The Chippewas are currently coached by Tony Barbee.

Postseason

NCAA tournament
The Chippewas have appeared in four NCAA tournaments. Their combined record is 3–4.

NIT
The Chippewas have appeared in the National Invitation Tournament (NIT) twice. Their combined record is 0–2.

College Basketball Invitational (CBI) results
The Chippewas have appeared in the Division I College Basketball Invitational (CBI) once. Their record is 0–1.

CIT
The Chippewas have appeared in the CollegeInsider.com Postseason Tournament (CIT) two times. Their combined record is 2–2.

NAIA Tournament results
Central Michigan went to the NAIA Tournament twice, garnering a record of 2–2. Former coach Ted Kjolhede was named NAIA Coach of the Year for 1966.

Player achievements and accolades

Retired numbers

The Chippewas have retired six numbers, in honor of seven different players.

Chippewas in the ABA/NBA
Nate Huffman (NBA 2002–2003)
Willie Iverson (ABA 1968–1969)
Chris Kaman (NBA 2003–2016)
Ben Kelso (NBA 1973–1974)
Dan Majerle (NBA 1988–2002)
Dan Roundfield (NBA 1975–1987)
Jim McElroy  (NBA 1975–1982)
Ben Poquette (NBA 1977–1987)

References

External links
 
 Basketball Reference